Smiths Beach is a small town on Phillip Island in Victoria, Australia. It is located on Back Beach Road, on the shores of Smiths Beach. It is home to a short-tailed shearwater (Australian muttonbird) colony.

The beach itself is about 1 kilometer long. It has been said to be great for surfing, paddle-boarding, swimming, and body surfing.

References

Phillip Island
Towns in Victoria (Australia)
Bass Coast Shire